Theodoros Nianiakas (born 25 August 1995) is a Greece international rugby league footballer who plays for the Woolston Rovers.

Playing career
In 2022, Nianiakas was named in the Greece squad for the 2021 Rugby League World Cup, the first ever Greek Rugby League squad to compete in a World Cup.

References

External links
Greece profile
Greek profile

1995 births
Living people
Rugby league second-rows
Greek rugby league players
Greece national rugby league team players